Gloria Zarza Guadarrama (born 20 August 1984) is a Mexican Paralympic athlete specializing in shot put. She represented Mexico in the Paralympic Games.

Career
Guadarrama made her international debut for Mexico at the 2016 Summer Paralympics where she finished in fourth place in the women's shot put F54 event.

Guadarrama again represented Mexico at the 2020 Summer Paralympics in the women's shot put F54 event and won a silver medal.

References

1984 births
Living people
Paralympic athletes of Mexico
Mexican female shot putters
Medalists at the 2019 Parapan American Games
Athletes (track and field) at the 2016 Summer Paralympics
Athletes (track and field) at the 2020 Summer Paralympics
Medalists at the 2020 Summer Paralympics
Paralympic medalists in athletics (track and field)
Paralympic silver medalists for Mexico
Sportspeople from the State of Mexico
Wheelchair shot putters
Paralympic shot putters
20th-century Mexican women
21st-century Mexican women